Ellingwood may refer to:

People with the family name
Albert R. Ellingwood (1887–1934), American mountaineer.
Bruce R. Ellingwood, American academic.
Finley Ellingwood, American physician.

People with the middle name
Francis Ellingwood Abbot (1836–1903), American philosopher and theologian.

Locations
Ellingwood Ledges (Crestone Needle), a climbing route in Colorado, U.S.
Ellingwood Point, a mountain summit in Colorado, U.S.